Sir William Young, 1st Baronet (died 1848) was a British baronet.

He was the son of the Reverend John Young and Anne McClintock. On 20 September 1806, he married Lucy Frederick (died 8 August 1856), daughter of Sir Charles Frederick and Hon. Lucy Boscawen. They had two daughters and five sons:

 Anna Young (died 7 June 1882). She married Baron Adolphe Christophe Edouard von Barnekow on 14 June 1860.
 Augusta Maria Young (died 29 November 1899). She married George Rolleston on 3 April 1841.
 John Young (born 31 August 1807, died 6 October 1876). He married Adelaide Annabella Dalton on 8 April 1835 and was created 1st Baron Lisgar on 26 October 1870.
 Thomas Young (born January 1810, died 1846). He married Mary J. Duncan Muston on 24 June 1844.
 Charles Young (born 3 June 1811, died 18 March 1838).
 William Young (born June 1817, died September 1850).
 Helenus Edward Young (born June 1822, died January 1851). He married Frances Skinner on 4 December 1844.

In 1814, William Young bought the Bailieborough Castle estate in County Cavan, Ireland, from Thomas Charles Stewart Corry. Young laid out the town of Bailieborough in its present location and was created 1st Baronet Young of Bailieborough Castle on 28 August 1821. In the 1830 United Kingdom general election, he was an unsuccessful candidate for the Cavan constituency.

He died on 10 March 1848, and he was succeeded by his eldest son, John Young, as 2nd Baronet.

References

Year of birth unknown
1848 deaths
Baronets in the Baronetage of the United Kingdom